Great South may refer to:
The Great South, a travel memoir by Edward King
Great South (Italy), a federation of parties of Southern Italy